The Thanthai Periyar Government Institute of Technology (abbreviated as TPGIT) is a government engineering institution located at Bagayam, Vellore. It was established in July 1990 and is one of the six government engineering colleges fully governed by the Directorate of Technical Education (DOTE) of the Government of Tamil Nadu. It is a Zonal Office for Zone 5 Colleges of Anna University.

The college was ranked 44 among 454 colleges affiliated to Anna University.

Location 

TPGIT is located in an atmosphere at Bagayam, Vellore which is 130 km west of Chennai and 220 km east of Bangalore. It is connected to both these cities by buses that leave from the heart of the town. Katpadi railway junction, 12 km from the college is directly connected to Chennai, Bangalore and from there to the rest of India. The nearest airport is at Chennai.
Thanthai periyar government institute of technology is a government college which is developing and enriching the students with wide aspects and perspects with varieties of resources available in the vellore with top trends with the campus opportunities and extensive lab facilities needed for the engineers. Bus no.1,2 connects the Katpadi station with college.

Courses offered 
The institution offers the following courses:

Undergraduate Courses:
B.E., Electronics & Communication Engineering
B.E., Mechanical Engineering
B.E., Civil engineering
B.E., Electrical and Electronics Engineering
B.E., Computer Science and Engineering
Post Graduate Courses
M.E., Applied Electronics
M.E., Manufacturing engineering
M.E., Structural Engineering 
MCA
Part Time Courses
M.E., Applied Electronics
M.E., Manufacturing Engineering
B.E., Electronics And Communication Engineering
B.E., Mechanical Engineering

Department of Mechanical Engineering

Department Of Mechanical Engineering has been established in the year 1990. A separate block for Mechanical Engineering has been functioning since 2006. The department has 13 sanctioned posts of faculties (1 Professor, 3 Assistant Professors & 9 Lecturers). Several students of this department have got university ranks.

As a part of promoting technical and research activities, the department organizes various Seminars, Guest Lectures Workshops and Conferences. The department has well-equipped laboratories and faculty members. The Department offers consultancy works in CNC machines and rapid prototyping.

The Department of Mechanical Engineering has evolved with comprehensive learning approaches other than lecture classes in an integrated manner through Lab Sessions, Assignments, Periodic Tests, Seminars, Industrial Training, effective Industrial Visits, Paper Presentations and Projects.

Department of Electronics and Communications Engineering

The Department of electronics and communication was established in the year 1990. The department has been accredited by NBA.  Several students of this department have got university ranks. Supported by a crew of staff members, the department stands green with the day-to-day developments in its infrastructural as well as laboratory facilities. The department has 13 sanctioned posts of faculties (1 Professor, 4 Associate Professors & 1 Assistant Professors).

As a part of promoting technical and research activities, the department periodically organizes various Seminars, Guest Lectures Workshops and Conferences. The department has equipped laboratories and faculty members.

Department of Civil Engineering
The department of Civil Engineering was established in the year 1990 having "Eco-Friendly Structures" as its theme area and offers B.E. Civil Engineering Programme. From 1990-91, four batches of Students passed out. The course was restarted with effect from 2004-05. The department has 13 sanctioned posts of faculties (1 Professor, 3 Assistant Professors & 9 Lecturers). In addition to the Undergraduate Programme, the Department is also offering consultancy and testing services in various Civil Engineering Fields like Structural Engineering, Geotechnical Engineering, Environmental Engineering, Surveying, Water Resources Engineering, etc... using equipments and software for Government, Public and Private Sectors.

The Department occupied separate RCC building of an area 2433sq.m, constructed in 2008 and also having AC Sheet roofing structural lab of an area 400sq.m. As a part of promoting technical and research activities, the department periodically organizes various Seminars, Guest Lectures Workshops and Conferences. The department has equipped laboratories and faculty members.

References

External links
Official Website

Engineering colleges in Tamil Nadu
Universities and colleges in Vellore district
Colleges affiliated to Anna University
Educational institutions established in 1990
1990 establishments in Tamil Nadu
Academic institutions formerly affiliated with the University of Madras